International Commercial Center in Ulaanbaatar, Mongolia is an office building on Jamyan Street between Olympic Street and Chinggis Avenue.

This building is the 11th tallest building in Ulaanbaatar, and was completed in 2014.

References 

List of tallest buildings in Mongolia